Dominic Amponsah (born 2006) is a Ghanaian professional footballer who plays as a forward for Accra Lions.

Club career
Having been promoted to the Accra Lions first team in early 2023, Amponsah's career got off to a good start, scoring four goals in his first three games in the Ghana Premier League.

Career statistics

Club

References

2006 births
Living people
Ghanaian footballers
Association football forwards
Ghana Premier League players